Vilnius University Astronomical Observatory is an astronomical observatory of Vilnius University. It was founded in 1753 by initiative of Thomas Zebrowski. The observatory is the fourth oldest observatory in the Europe. While the observatory is no longer able to make astronomical observations due to light pollution in Vilnius (observations are carried out at Molėtai Astronomical Observatory), it continues scientific research.

Early history

In 1753, on the initiative of Thomas Zebrowski the Vilnius University Astronomical Observatory was established, which was among the first observatories in Europe and the first in the Polish-Lithuanian Commonwealth. The construction was funded by Elżbieta Ogińska-Puzynina. First telescope (13.5 cm reflector) was donated by Michał Kazimierz "Rybeńko" Radziwiłł, Supreme Commander of the army of the Grand Duchy of Lithuania. Second, 10 cm reflector, was donated by bishop of Vilnius Józef Stanisław Sapieha.

The golden age of Astronomical Observatory has begun when Marcin Odlanicki Poczobutt was director of the Observatory (1764–1807). In 1777, Poczobutt created a constellation Taurus Poniatovii to honor Stanisław August Poniatowski, King of Poland and Grand Duke of Lithuania. He was very skillful observer and left a lot of observational data. Later these observations were used by Jérôme Lalande in his calculations of Mercury orbit. Poczobutt also decided to build an extension of the observatory to the south. It was designed and built by the famous architect Marcin Knackfuss in 1782–88.

Later the observatory was headed by Jan Sniadecki (1807–1825) and Piotr Slawinski (1825–1843). They observed planets, their satellites, asteroids and comets, eclipses of the Sun and Moon. In 1861, G. Sabler, the director of the observatory, proposed to acquire for that purpose new instruments, among which there were a solar photoheliograph, a photometer and a spectroscope. Spectroscopic observations of the Sun and photometric observations of stars were initiated.

In 1864, director Georg Sabler installed a photoheliograph in the Vilnius University Astronomical Observatory, which was only the second such device in the entire world (after London). Since 1868, for the first time in the world, a systematic photographic service of sunspots dynamics was launched in Vilnius.

In 1876, a fire broke out in the observatory, causing a heavy damage. The observatory did not receive any funds for the restoration and five years later was closed. The library and instruments were distributed among various institutions of Russia, the main part of them were transferred to Pulkovo Observatory.

After World War I
The astronomical observatory was revived only after World War I. In Vilnius, occupied by Poland, a Department of Astronomy was set up at the reopened Vilnius University. Wladyslaw Dziewulski, a famous Polish astronomer, was appointed as the head of this department. The location of the old observatory was no longer suitable for astronomical observations. Therefore, in 1921 it was decided to build a new observatory. For that purpose a site was allocated in the outskirts of the city near Vingis Park on the present M.K.Čiurlionis street. The observatory was equipped with two 15 cm Zeiss astrographs and a 48 cm reflector with a spectrograph.

After World War II
After World War II activities of Lithuanian astronomers resumed at the Astronomical Observatory of Vilnius University. Professor Paulius Slavėnas became the head of the observatory. In 1957–62 a number of instruments (the 12 cm and 16 cm astrographs, 25 cm and 48 cm reflectors and the slitless Zeiss spectrograph) were restored and renovated. The investigation of variable stars and photometric observations in Vilnius multicolour photometric system, created by Vytautas Straižys were started.

After expansion of Vilnius, accurate astronomical observations became impossible due to air and light pollution in the 1960s. In 1968, the 48 cm telescope was moved to Simeiz Observatory in Crimea where it was in use up to 1973. Later it was moved to Maidanak Observatory in Uzbekistan. In 1974, the 63 cm reflector was put in operation at Molėtai Astronomical Observatory. The observatory became involved in design and construction of photometric equipment for telescopes, in the study of variable stars, physical and chemical properties of stars, interstellar matter, the structure of the Milky Way, Andromeda, Triangulum galaxies. In 1960–92, in collaboration with the Institute of Physics and Mathematics, Astronomical Observatory published Bulletin of the Vilnius Astronomical Observatory.

The heads of observatories after World War II were: Bernardas Kodatis (1941–44), Paulius Slavėnas (1944–52 and 1956–69), Borisas Voronkovas (1952–56), Alfonsas Misiukas-Misiūnas (1969–78), Romualdas Kalytis (1978–92), Jokūbas Sūdžius (1992–08), Vladas Vansevičius (from 2008).

See also
 List of Jesuit sites

References

Astronomical observatories in Lithuania
Buildings and structures of Vilnius University
1753 establishments in Europe